Havas SA is a French multinational advertising and public relations company, headquartered in Paris, France. It operates in more than 100 countries and is one of the largest advertising and communications groups in the world. 

Havas consists of three main operational divisions. The group offers digital, advertising, direct marketing, media planning and buying, corporate communications, sales promotion, design, human resources, sports marketing, multimedia interactive communications, public relations, and innovation consulting.

History
The original Havas was the world's first news agency, created in 1835. The Agence France-Presse news agency comes from it. Havas was acquired by Vivendi in 1998, and renamed Vivendi Universal Publishing. VUP in turn merged with Lagardere to become Editis in 2004.

The company which today bears the name Havas is itself a former subsidiary of the company which acquired the rights to the name in 2002. It is a holding company headquartered in Puteaux, Paris.

French corporate raider Vincent Bolloré, through his holding company the Bolloré Group, is the main shareholder, controlling 32.84% of the share capital as of 7 May 2012.  Bolloré himself took over the chairmanship of the Havas board (Président du conseil d'administration). In November 2017, Havas acquired Malaysia-based agency Immerse and rebranded to Havas Immerse.

In April 2022, Havas acquired the UK-based digital agency and Google partner, Search Laboratory.

Timeline
Havas is the family name of Charles-Louis Havas. He created the first French press agency in 1835.

Havas Conseil – Havas Advertising
By 1968, Havas had become a diversified group which had, inter alia, media interests. These interests were incorporated into a société anonyme, Havas Conseil S.A., which expanded its business rapidly.

In 1975, Havas Conseil became Eurocom, holding company of a Group of subsidiaries specializing in various communications activities.

Since the 1970s, the Group grew significantly in France and internationally, both in the communications and media buying sectors, by broadening the scope of services that it offers and expanding into new communications techniques and technologies.

Havas was first listed on the Paris Bourse (now the Euronext Paris) in 1982. The principal milestones in the Group's strategic development are the following:

In 1991, Eurocom acquired the French advertising group RSCG, leading to the creation of the Euro RSCG Worldwide advertising network. RSCG had been the lead advertising agency for Peugeot. In 1996, Eurocom changed its name to Havas Advertising and created four operating divisions, Euro RSCG, Campus, Diversified Agencies, and Médiapolis. American Bob Schmetterer is named chairman and CEO of the largest division Euro RSCG, whose headquarters are moved to New York in 1997.

In 1998, Compagnie Générale des Eaux, led by Jean-Marie Messier, changed its name to Vivendi and acquired control of Havas (and its subsidiary Havas Advertising); it acquired a third of Havas in February 1997, and the remainder in March 1998 in a deal that valued the company at €6 billion (£4.05 billion). Vivendi later considered its advertising and communications interests no longer strategic.

Between 1998 and 2001, late in the wave of consolidation within the advertising/communications sector, Havas Advertising adopted an aggressive acquisition strategy in order not to become a takeover target following its independence from Havas. In order to become a bigger and more global player, it acquired MPG and Snyder, as well as around one hundred specialized agencies in America, Europe and the Asia Pacific region. This strategy was criticised by Maurice Levy as "reckless."

"Media Planning Group" was created in 1999 through the combination of Media Planning, S.A., a Spanish media planning and buying company controlled by Léopoldo Rodés Castañes and his family, with Médiapolis, the existing Havas media planning business. Havas initially acquired 45% of MPG, which was increased to 100% in May 2001.

Snyder Communications Inc.
On 4 April 2000, at the height of the M&A frenzy, Havas Advertising agreed to acquire Snyder Communications, Inc. (SNC) in an all-share transaction, where SNC was valued at US$2.1 billion.

SNC was a listed communications group controlled by Daniel Snyder, and their activities were mainly outsourced marketing services, such as direct marketing, database marketing, proprietary product sampling, sponsored information display in prime locations, call centres, field sales. Just prior to the takeover, the market capitalisation of SNC was just US$1.3 billion. As part of the SNC deal, Havas Advertising listed American Depositary Shares (ADSs) on the NASDAQ National Market System. The deal was completed on 25 September; the stake belonging to Vivendi was diluted to 40% following the acquisition. The sale provided Snyder with funds he used to acquire the Washington Redskins team and their stadium for $800 million in May 1999, in what was at the time a record price for a US sports franchise.

SNC's three divisions: Bounty SCA Worldwide, Arnold Communications and Brann Worldwide were respectively merged with Euro RSCG, Campus, and Diversified Agencies. Arnold Communications becomes Havas' second network, Arnold Worldwide Partners.

Havas S.A. 
In 2000, Havas the parent company decided to rename itself Vivendi Universal Publishing and to divest itself of its remaining stake in the Havas Advertising business. The Havas Advertising board decided to acquire the Havas name from its parent, and the decision was approved by the annual shareholders meeting held on 23 May 2002.

In September 2003, the group reorganized itself, as agencies from the Diversified Agencies division were sold or absorbed into three core divisions:Euro RSCG Worldwide (integrated communications); MPG (Media planning and buying) and Arnold Worldwide Partners (advertising). In July 2004, after having completed its strategic reorganization, Bolloré Group started acquiring a stake in Havas. In October, the Company completed a €404 million capital increase which enabled it to reduce its overall debt levels.

By 2005, Bolloré had amassed a 22% stake, obtained 4 seats on the Havas board at the shareholders meeting, and took control of the company. Chairman and CEO Alain de Pouzilhac was deposed in a boardroom coup on 21 June 2005. Other board and management level changes followed. The board appointed independent non-executive director Richard Colker as interim CEO. On 12 July 2005, Havas named Vincent Bolloré as board chairman, and veteran banker Philippe Wahl as chief executive officer. In March 2006, Havas named Fernando Rodés Vilà, son of the founder of Media Planning S.A. Leopoldo Rodés Castañes, as its new CEO.
    
Havas remained listed on Euronext, but delisted from the NASDAQ stock exchange as of 28 July 2006.

In March 2015, the group's main shareholder Bollore S.A sold a 22.5 percent stake in the firm for around €600 million, but announced it intended to remain a majority shareholder.

Services
Havas is a media holding company, whose subsidiaries provide communication consulting services, through traditional advertising media (television, radio and print and display), to media buying, and various marketing services such as advertising management, direct marketing, sales promotion, corporate communications, blockchain and ICO marketing, healthcare communications, internal communications, Television sponsorship, design, human resources communications and interactive communications.

Attempting to be perceived by clients and potential clients as "more entrepreneurial and more agile", Havas adopted a new structure in late 2012. The agency network once known as Euro RSCG was rebranded 'Havas Worldwide', much like their compatriots Publicis and their network, named 'Publicis Worldwide'. Other advertising agencies owned by Havas, such as Arnold Worldwide are rebranded 'Havas Creative'; the media division remains as 'Havas Media'. Havas created an umbrella brand, Havas Digital Group, to operate across the Creative and Media divisions.

Case against former directors 
Holding 22.01% of the share capital of Havas, on 21 June 2005, Bolloré ousted CEO Alain de Pouzilhac. Havas then dismissed Hérail for gross negligence; vice-chairman Alain Cayzac and others close to de Pouzilhac were also relieved of their services. Alain de Pouzilhac took Havas to court to seek unblocking of payment for non-compete that Havas had been withholding; civil cases were also launched by both for severance pay – a total of ten cases (including appeals) involving de Pouzilhac, four involving Hérail. Payment for de Pouzilhac's non-compete clause was upheld. Hérail and former Havas executives Alain Cayzac and Agnès Audier won at the labour tribunal, where Hérail was granted damages of close to €5 million.

Since the boardroom coup, Bolloré had consolidated control by further increasing his stake, which stood at 37% as of November 2012. Havas seized the Nanterre criminal court on 15 May 2007, and again in August and November 2007 to initiate three cases against de Pouzilhac, Hérail and Cayzac, accusing them of "conspiracy, misappropriating from the company, and attempting to cover up". Havas alleged that the three directors had signed new employment contracts during the takeover that gave them generous golden parachutes in the likely event of their removal. Also, de Pouzilhac was accused of conspiring with Hérail to grant payment of €300,000 to fellow director Thierry Meyer. The preliminary inquiry into the charges under public prosecutor Philippe Courroye lasted three years, during which time the accused were given either sporadic or no access to evidence for their defence, contrary to the legal requirements. 
"The Tribunal took the view that the criminal proceedings had not complied with proper procedures, nor with the European Convention on Human Rights. The Nanterre Court said that specifically, the provisions of this Convention relating in particular to access to the case file, the personal assistance of counsel during the investigation and the balance between the parties had not been met. In its decision, the Court considered that, given the weight and complexity of the case, which had 700 items – a preliminary investigation was not the most appropriate way of proceeding. Instead, the case should have been by instruction, which allows adversarial examination."Les Echos, 15 November 2012
The criminal court of Nanterre dismissed the last of these cases in November 2012, citing "the lack of equity and violation of the rights of the defence". Olivier Metzner and Olivier Bluche, lawyers for Alain de Pouzilhac and Jacques Hérail, criticised Vincent Bolloré for exploiting his close connection with Philippe Courroye, public prosecutor for Nanterre, to launch the case.

See also
 CNews

References

External links
 Havas Official Website
 
 Agence Havas news reports, 1845-1848 (bulk: 1847-1848) From the University of Pennsylvania: Kislak Center for Special Collections, Rare Books and Manuscripts

 
Advertising agencies of France
Companies based in Paris
Privatized companies of France
Marketing companies established in 1968
Vivendi subsidiaries
French companies established in 1968
Companies formerly listed on the Paris Bourse
Companies formerly listed on the Nasdaq